Lindley is an English surname. Notable people with the surname include:

 Alfred Lindley (1904–1951), American lawyer and sportsman
 Audra Lindley (1918–1997), American actress
 Augustus Frederick Lindley (1840–1873), Royal Navy officer involved in the Taiping reform movement in China
 Butch Lindley (1948–1990), American NASCAR racer
 Charles Lindley (1865–1957), Swedish socialist and trade union activist
 David Lindley (musician) (1944–2023), American guitarist 
 David Lindley (physicist) (born 1956), British theoretical physicist and author 
 Debbie Lindley (born 1973), British TV presenter and journalist
 Dennis Lindley (1923–2013), British statistician
 Dick Lindley, English professional footballer
 Earl Lindley (1933–2012), Canadian professional football player
 Eric Lindley (born 1982), American artist, writer, and musician
 Fred Lindley  (born 1878), English Labour Party politician, Member of Parliament (MP) for Rotherham 1923–31
 Fleetwood Lindley, the last surviving person to have viewed Abraham Lincoln's body
 Florence Lindley, British school headmistress
 Florrie Lindley, fictional character in British TV soap opera Coronation Street
 Sir Francis Lindley (1872–1950), British diplomat
 Hilda Lindley, American environmentalist
 Howard Lindley (died 1972), Australian journalist and filmmaker
 Isaac Lindley (1904–1989), Peruvian businessman
 Jacob Lindley (1774–1857), first president of Ohio University
 James Lindley (born 1981), English footballer
 James Johnson Lindley (1822–1891), U.S. Representative from Missouri
 Jen Lindley, fictional character in American TV drama Dawson's Creek
 Jimmy Lindley (1935–2022), English jockey and broadcaster
 John Lindley (1799–1865), English botanist, gardener and orchidologist
 John Lindley (cinematographer) (born 1951), American cinematographer
 Jonathan Lindley (1756–1828), one of the original settlers of Orange County, Indiana
 Leta Lindley (born 1972), American professional golfer
 Louis Burton Lindley, Jr., better known as the actor Slim Pickens
 Mark Lindley (born 1937), American musicologist and historian
 Maurice Lindley (1915–1994), English football player, coach and manager
 Nathaniel Lindley, Baron Lindley (1828–1921), English jurist, son of John Lindley
 Paul Lindley (born 1966), English businessman
 Richard Lindley (author) (born 1949), English author
 Robert Lindley (1776–1855), English cellist
 Ryan Lindley (born 1989), American footballer
 Simon Lindley (born 1948), British organist, choirmaster, conductor and composer
 Siri Lindley (born 1969), American triathlete and coach
 Thomas Jefferson Lindley (1843–1915), American Civil War soldier, farmer and politician
 Tinsley Lindley (1865–1940), English footballer
 Trevard Lindley (born 1986), American footballer
 Walter C. Lindley (1880–1958), United States federal judge
 William Lindley (1808–1900), English civil engineer
 Sir William Heerlein Lindley (1853–1917), British civil engineer, son of William Lindley

See also
Lindley (given name)

Surnames of English origin